Woodstar may refer to a number of species of hummingbird in the family Trochilidae:

Amethyst woodstar (Calliphlox amethystina)
Bahama woodstar (Calliphlox evelynae)
Chilean woodstar (Eulidia yarrellii)
Esmeraldas woodstar (Chaetocercus berlepschi)
Gorgeted woodstar (Chaetocercus heliodor)
Inagua woodstar (Calliphlox lyrura)
Little woodstar (Chaetocercus bombus)
Magenta-throated woodstar (Calliphlox bryantae)
Purple-collared woodstar (Myrtis fanny)
Purple-throated woodstar (Calliphlox mitchellii)
Rufous-shafted woodstar (Chaetocercus jourdanii)
Santa Marta woodstar (Chaetocercus astreans)
Slender-tailed woodstar (Microstilbon burmeisteri)
White-bellied woodstar (Chaetocercus mulsant)
Short-tailed woodstar (Myrmia micrura)
Sparkling-tailed woodstar (Tilmatura dupontii)

See also
List of hummingbirds – species

Animal common name disambiguation pages